The government of Mato Grosso do Sul is led by the Governor of Mato Grosso do Sul, Brazil, and is elected by the local population through popular suffrage and direct secret ballot for a four-year term. The current governor is Eduardo Riedel. Its seat is the governorate of Mato Grosso do Sul, which has been the seat of the government of Mato Grosso do Sul since 1983.

The governor has no residence and lives in his own house. Like the Republic, Mato Grosso do Sul is governed by three powers, the executive is represented by the governor, the legislature is represented by the Legislative Assembly of Mato Grosso do Sul and the judiciary is represented by the court of Mato Grosso do Sul. Judge of the State of Mato Grosso do Sul.

Executive 

 Governor: Reinaldo Azambuja
 Vice Governor: Murilo Zauith

Current secretaries of state

Legislative 
The Legislative Power of Mato Grosso do Sul is unicameral, constituted by the Legislative Assembly of the State of Mato Grosso do Sul, located in the Guaicurus Palace. It is made up of 24 deputies, who are elected every 4 years.

 President: Paulo Correa

Judiciary 
The highest court of the South Mato Grosso Judiciary is the Court of Justice of the State of Mato Grosso do Sul, based in Parque dos Poderes. It has districts in all 79 municipalities of the state with their respective Forums, which are the headquarters of each District.

 President: Paschoal Carmello Leandro

References 

Mato Grosso do Sul